The president of Sinn Féin is the most senior politician within the Sinn Féin political party in Ireland. Since 10 February 2018, the office has been held by Mary Lou McDonald, following the decision of Gerry Adams to stand down as leader of the party and not seek re-election again. Unlike other political parties, the president of Sinn Féin does not have the power to dismiss or appoint their deputy and to dismiss or appoint parliamentary party members to front bench positions. These decisions are taken by the Ard Chomhairle (National Executive).

If the president is not a member of Dáil Éireann, then a TD is appointed in their place to act as the leader of the parliamentary party.

The vice president of Sinn Féin is Michelle O'Neill.

Background

Although Sinn Féin was founded in 1905 by Arthur Griffith, Griffith did not initially take the presidency. Edward Martyn, a cultural activist and playwright, was elected president at the party's first annual convention on 28 November 1905. He was succeeded in 1908 by John Sweetman. Griffith served as vice president until he was finally elected president in 1911. At the Ard Fheis of 1917, which followed the Easter Rising, Griffith stepped down in favour of Éamon de Valera.

De Valera is the only one of the fifteen leaders to date to have been head of government while serving as leader. Griffith and de Valera were elected in the 1918 general election and were involved in the creation of the First Dáil. De Valera served as President of the Dáil and Griffith served first as Minister for Home Affairs, then as Minister for Foreign Affairs, and finally, following the Anglo-Irish Treaty, as President of the Dáil. De Valera, as an anti-Treaty republican, did not sit in the Third Dáil. He resigned from both the leadership and the party in 1926, when his motion to allow elected members to sit in the Dáil was defeated at the party's Ard Fheis. De Valera's successor John J. O'Kelly was one of four leaders who served for brief periods of time as Sinn Féin’s party membership declined in favour of Fianna Fáil and Fine Gael.

In 1937, Margaret Buckley became the first female President of Sinn Féin. During her thirteen years as leader, she vastly improved the relations between the IRA and the party. She was succeeded by Paddy McLogan and Tomás Ó Dubhghaill who both helped rebuild party support in the aftermath of World War II. Tomás Mac Giolla became president in 1962 and served for over eight years as leader of the party. When the party split, Mac Giolla remained leader of Official Sinn Féin. Official Sinn Féin was later renamed the Workers' Party. Ruairí Ó Brádaigh was elected as the new leader of the Provisional Sinn Féin in 1970. Ó Brádaigh's presidency was shaped by relentless violence between republican and loyalist paramilitaries and the British security forces. He was one of the republican representatives which met with the British representatives in hope of ending the Troubles.

Ó Brádaigh resigned in 1983, due to dissatisfaction among party activists in Northern Ireland. Vice President Gerry Adams became the fourteenth President of the party in 1983. He became the longest serving president in the party’s history. During his presidency, the IRA declared a ceasefire and the Good Friday Agreement was signed. Party support rose as Sinn Féin became the largest nationalist party in Northern Ireland. In 2011, Gerry Adams left the Northern Ireland Assembly and won a seat in Dáil Éireann. He is the first president since 1926 to also sit in Dáil Éireann.

Presidents

1905–1926

1926–present

Vice presidents
Unlike other political party leaders, the president of Sinn Féin does not have the power to appoint or dismiss their deputy. The position is elected by members of the party at the Ardfheis. The Vice-President has a seat on the Ard Chomhairle (National Executive) Officer Board.

1905–1983

1983–present
Following the election of Gerry Adams as the 14th President of Sinn Féin, the position of co-vice presidents was removed. Instead, a single vice-president was elected at the 1983 Ard Fheis to serve in place of the two former vice-presidents.

Parliamentary party leaders

Leader in Dáil Éireann

Leader in Seanad Éireann

Leader in European Parliament

See also
 History of Sinn Féin
 Leader of Fianna Fáil
 Leader of Fine Gael
 Leader of the Labour Party

Notes

References

Sinn Féin
 
Sinn Féin
Ireland politics-related lists